This is a list of the number-one hits of 1972 on Italian Hit Parade Singles Chart.

Number-one artists

See also
1972 in music

References

1972 in Italian music
Italy
1972